Hael or Haël may refer to:

People
 Ithel Hael, early sixth century prince of Armorica
 Mordaf Hael, sixth century dynast written about in the Black Book of Chirk
 Rhydderch Hael (fl. died 614), ruler of Alt Clut
 William Griffith the Hael (1445–1540), Welsh politician

Other
 , a cultivar of Karuka
 Haël Workshops for Artistic Ceramics, German stoneware manufacturer
 Lower Hael Wood, a woodland in Wales